The Prince of Ning rebellion was a rebellion that took place in China between 10 July and 20 August 1519 during the Ming dynasty. It was started by Zhu Chenhao, Prince of Ning and a fifth-generation descendant of Zhu Quan, and was aimed at overthrowing the Zhengde Emperor. The Prince of Ning revolt was one of two princedom rebellions during the Zhengde Emperor's reign; it was preceded by the Prince of Anhua rebellion in 1510.

Background
The first Prince of Ning, Zhu Quan, was awarded the title for his military service under the Hongwu Emperor and was given the land of Daning, a region north of Beijing. Ning was later moved to Nanchang in Jiangxi by the Yongle Emperor. His fifth generation descendant and fourth Prince of Ning was Zhu Chenhao, a leader known more for his indulgent lifestyle and hedonism than his military prowess.

The Zhengde Emperor was warned of the rumor of Zhu Chenhao's treason prior to the rebellion. There were reports that Zhu had been gathering an army, when the military power of regional princes had long ago been abolished. Zhu had also been bribing members of the Zhengde Emperor's cabinet, as part of his plans to usurp the throne. In 1507, he offered the official Liu Jin a large sum of money in exchange for personal bodyguards, a bribe that Liu agreed to but was unable to carry out, once he was executed for plotting against the emperor in September 1510. In 1514, he funded bandits as henchmen, seized land and property, issued taxes, and received bodyguards after successfully bribing the general and Minister of War Lu Wan.

Zhu Chenhao also tried to bribe the famous painter Guo Xu to his side, and although Guo took the money he immediately gave it away. 

The Zhengde Emperor, who was childless, lacked an heir and Zhu had been pushing for his son to take over as heir apparent. The rumors were ignored by the emperor, who did not respond to the allegations. By the end of 1514, Zhu was so emboldened that he began to refer to himself as emperor and issued his commands as imperial edicts. This too was ignored by the Zhengde Emperor.

Rebellion
On 14 June 1519, Zhu Chenhao initiated the rebellion by announcing that the Zhengde Emperor was not the legitimate successor of the Hongzhi Emperor and had usurped the throne. His army marched north, in an attempt to capture the city Nanjing. On their way to Nanjing, Zhu attacked Anqing on 9 August but failed to capture it. The Neo-Confucian philosopher and general Wang Yangming was sent out to suppress the rebellion and captured the Ning princedom's capital of Nanchang on 13 August 1519. Zhu's army was defeated by Wang on 20 August 1519, ending the forty-two days of rebellion, and Zhu was later captured. It is largely believed that although Zhu had planned his rebellion for over a decade, Wang had already foreseen his intentions and, assisted by reputable poet Lei Ji, had been sowing discontent in the Prince's ranks many years before the rebellion.

Aftermath
Zhu was sentenced to slow slicing, the punishment for treason, but committed suicide on 13 January 1521. The officials and eunuchs who had conspired with Zhu were also sentenced to death. Two years after the revolt, Zhengde died of an illness in 1521 caught after, according to legend, falling off a boat while drunk on a fishing trip.

References

Rebellions in the Ming dynasty
1519 in Asia
Conflicts in 1519
16th century in China
1519 in China
Rebellious princes